Eremophila cuneata is a flowering plant in the figwort family, Scrophulariaceae and is endemic to the Shark Bay area of Western Australia. It is a rarely-seen, small shrub with wedge-shaped leaves and white to cream-coloured flowers.

Description

The flowers are only known from one immature flower on the type specimen. The petal tube is white or cream-coloured and glabrous. The 4 stamens are fully enclosed within the tube.

Taxonomy and naming
The species was first formally described by Robert Chinnock in 2007 and the description was published in Eremophila and Allied Genera: A Monograph of the Plant Family Myoporaceae. The type specimen was collected by Malcolm Trudgen near Steep Point. The specific epithet (cuneata) is a Latin word meaning "wedge-shaped", referring to the shape of the leaves.

Distribution and habitat
Eremophila cuneata is known from only three plants seen by Malcolm Trudgen in the Steep Point area growing below limestone outcrops in calcareous sand in the Yalgoo biogeographic region.

Conservation status
Eremophila cuneata is classified as "Priority One" by the Government of Western Australia Department of Parks and Wildlife, meaning that it is known from only one or a few locations which are potentially at risk.

References

cuneata
Eudicots of Western Australia
Plants described in 2007
Endemic flora of Western Australia